Gandab or Gand Ab may refer to the following locations in Iran:
Gandab, Chaharmahal and Bakhtiari
Gandab, Golestan
Gandab, Ilam
Gandab, Kerman
Gandab, Kermanshah
Gandab, Javanrud, Kermanshah Province
Gandab-e Olya, Kermanshah
Gandab-e Sofla, Kermanshah
Gandab, Kurdistan
Gandab-e Olya, Kurdistan
Gandab-e Sofla, Kurdistan
Gand Ab, Borujerd, Lorestan Province
Gandab, Dorud, Lorestan Province
Gandab, Markazi
Gandab, Mazandaran
Gandab, Razavi Khorasan
Gandab, Fariman, Razavi Khorasan Province
Gandab, Semnan
Gandab, Zanjan